Tchia is a action-adventure video game developed by Awaceb and published by Kepler Interactive. In the game, the player assumes control of the titular character as she explores a fictional archipelago inspired by New Caledonia. The game was released for Microsoft Windows, PlayStation 4 and PlayStation 5 on March 21, 2023.

Gameplay

Tchia is an action-adventure video game played from a third-person perspective. The player assumes control of the titular protagonist, who must explore a tropical archipelago to rescue her kidnapped father. Tchia has the ability of "soul jumping", which allows her to possess and assume control of animals and inanimate objects found in the world, and uses their power to travel to new areas, solve puzzles, and defend herself against opponents. For instance, by soul jumping to a dog, players can use its ability to dig to dig out treasure maps. According to developer Phil Crifo, players can soul jump to more than 30 animals and "hundreds of" objects.

Tchia can also explore the archipelago in her human form. She is equipped with a glider and a raft which allows her to navigate between places quickly. Tchia is also highly acrobatic, as she can quickly slide down a mountain, climb up trees and use it to catapult herself across the canopy, and ascend nearly all types of surfaces. Through exploration, players will discover different points of interest, minigames, and chests with cosmetic items, meet other non-playable characters, and complete side quests. Tchia also features elements from rhythm games, as players can play Tchia's ukelele at will in the game. Players can also play "‘Soul-Melodies", which allows Tchia to perform feats such as summoning animals for soul jumping, altering the time of day, or changing the in-game weather. These gameplay sequences, however, are completely skippable. Tchia's appearance, as well as her glider and her raft, can be extensively customized.

Development

Tchia is currently being developed by a team of 12 people in Awaceb, an independent game studio based in Montreal. While the setting of the game was entirely fictional, it was heavily inspired by New Caledonia, a Pacific nation where the founders of Aweceb, Thierry Boura and Phil Crifo, grew up. In particular, Kanak culture was a major source of inspiration for the team. One of the goals for the studio was to "show what it was like exploring New Caledonia" when the two were still kids. Most members of the studio travelled to Lifou for two weeks to conduct research for the game, as well as showing a demo of the game to the indigenous population. Similar to the natives in New Caledonia, the characters in the game spoke both French and Drehu; as there were no professional voice actors who spoke Drehu, the studio had a difficult time recruiting people to record lines for the game. The character of Tchia was described to be "curious" and "a bit naïve". As she slowly explores the world, she gradually meets different non-playable characters and helps resolve their conflicts, breaking down the wall between different communities. The soul-jumping ability was also inspired by New Caledonia's folklore about shapeshifting.

The team received funding from Kowloon Nights in August 2019 for the development of the game, then known as "Project Caillou". It will be co-published by Kepler Interactive, a publishing label jointly operated by several independent game developers including Awaceb. Tchia is powered by Unreal Engine. The game was officially announced during The Game Awards 2020. The game was originally set to be released in 2022, though it was ultimately delayed to 2023. The game is currently set to be released on March 21, 2023 for Microsoft Windows via the Epic Games Store, PlayStation 4 and PlayStation 5.

References

External links
 

2023 video games
Action-adventure games
Indie video games
Open-world video games
PlayStation 4 games
PlayStation 5 games
Single-player video games
Unreal Engine games
Video games about shapeshifting
Video games developed in Canada
Video games set in Oceania
Windows games
Video games featuring black protagonists